Jørgen Munkeby (born 3 September 1980 in Oslo, Norway) is a Norwegian jazz and heavy metal musician, singer, songwriter, and record producer, known as the frontman in the band Shining and former member of Jaga Jazzist.

Career 
Munkeby formed Shining as a jazz quartet in 1999, together with fellow students from the Norwegian Academy of Music, Morten Qvenild, Torstein Lofthus and Aslak Hartberg. He played flute, alto flute, tenor saxophone, bass clarinet and keyboards in jazz band Jaga Jazzist (1994–2002), where he was one of the main composers on the album A Livingroom Hush, which was named the best jazz album of 2002 by the BBC. He also plays in the bands "Damp" and "Chrome Hill", and worked with Motorpsycho, Enslaved, Ihsahn, In Lingua Mortua, Bertine Zetlitz, Big Bang, Superfamily, Grand Island, Jim Stärk, Casualties of Cool, and Emperor among others.

Discography (in selection) 
Within Jaga Jazzist
1996: Jævla Jazzist Grete Stitz (Thug Records)
1998: Magazine EP (Dbut Records)
2001: A Livingroom Hush (Warner Music Norway)
2001: Airborne/Going Down EP (Warner Music Norway)
2001: Going Down 12" (Smalltown Supersound)
2002: The Stix (Smalltown Supersound / Warner Music Norway)
2002: Days 12", (Smalltown Supersound)

Within Shining
2001: Where The Ragged People Go (BP Records)
2003: Sweet Shanghai Devil (Jazzland Records)
2005: In the Kingdom of Kitsch You Will Be a Monster (Rune Grammofon)
2007: Grindstone (Rune Grammofon)
2010: Blackjazz (Indie Recordings)
2011: Live Blackjazz (Indie Recordings)
2013: One One One (Universal Records) 
2015: International Blackjazz Society (Spinefarm Records)
2018: Animal (Spinefarm Records)

With other projects
2002: In The Fishtank (Konkurrent), with Motorpsycho & "Jaga Jazzist Horns»
2004: Little Things (Propeller Recordings), with Hanne Hukkelberg
2010: After, with Ihsahn
2012: Eremita, with Ihsahn
2014: Inferno (Prosthetic Records), with Marty Friedman
2015: "Viscera", with Haunted Shores
2016: Arktis (Candlelight Records), with Ihsahn
2016: Melancholy, with Poetry in Telegrams
2017: Wall of Sound (Prosthetic Records), with Marty Friedman
2017: In Contact (Inside Out Music), with Caligula's Horse
2018: Queen of Time (Nuclear Blast), with Amorphis
2018: Become (eOne), with Zardonic
2021: Trivial Optical Tricks, with Poetry In Telegrams
2022: Magnum Opus (Black Lion Records), with IATT
2022: The Final Lullaby, with Epica
2023: "Wildfire", with Periphery

References 

Jaga Jazzist members
Norwegian keyboardists
Norwegian saxophonists
Norwegian flautists
Norwegian composers
Norwegian male composers
Musicians from Oslo
1980 births
Living people
21st-century saxophonists
Shining (Norwegian band) members
Chrome Hill (band) members
21st-century flautists